Elections to The Highland Council were held on 5 May 2022, the same day as the 31 other Scottish local government elections. The election used the 21 wards created under the Local Governance (Scotland) Act 2004, with 74 councillors being elected. Each ward elected either 3 or 4 members, using the STV electoral system.

New ward boundaries were proposed by Boundaries Scotland in 2021 which would have reduced the total number of councillors to 73; however these were rejected by the Scottish Parliament.

At the previous election in 2017, independent councillors won the most seats and formed a coalition administration with the Labour and Liberal Democrat groups.

Background

Composition
Since the previous election, there were several changes in the composition of the council. A number were changes to the political affiliation of councillors, including SNP councillors Calum MacLeod, Maxine Smith, Pauline Munro and Liz MacDonald who resigned from the party to become independents and independent councillor Donnie Mackay who resigned from the independent administration to join the Conservatives. Independent councillor Andrew Baxter was removed from the independent administration and initially continued under the designation "Real Independent" before joining the Conservatives. SNP councillor Ken Gowans resigned from the party to become an independent in 2017 before subsequently rejoining the party the following year.

In total, nine by-elections were held and resulted in an independent gain from the Liberal Democrats, a Liberal Democrats gain from the SNP, an SNP gain from the Liberal Democrats, an SNP hold, an independent hold, an independent gain from the Conservatives, two Liberal Democrats gains from independents and an SNP gain from the Conservatives. Independent councillor Ben Thompson resigned from the council in November 2021 and Tom Heggie, also an independent councillor, died in February 2022 which left vacancies on the council which would not be filled as they occurred less than six months before the election.

Notes

Retiring councillors
Of the 72 sitting councillors before the election, 30 did not stand for re-election. Additionally, four councillors contested different wards from the ones they previously represented.  With four sitting councillors defeated at the polls, only 38 sitting councillors were re-elected in 2022.

Proposed boundary changes
Following the passing of the Islands (Scotland) Act 2018, a review of the boundaries was undertaken in North Ayrshire, Argyll and Bute, Highland, Orkney Islands, Shetland Islands and Comhairle nan Eilean Siar. The Act allowed single- or two-member wards to be created to provide better representation of island communities. New ward boundaries were proposed by Boundaries Scotland in 2021 which would have reduced the number of wards by one to 20 and the number of councillors by one to 73. The proposals would have made no changes to the boundaries or numbers of councillors in Cromarty Firth; Fort William and Ardnamurchan; Nairn and Cawdor and Thurso and North West Caithness. The boundaries in Eilean a' Cheò and North, West and Central Sutherland would have remained the same but the numbers of councillors would have been reduced from four to three and from three to two respectively. Further changes would have seen four new wards created in Inverness, with the total number of councillors representing the city rising from 16 to 18 while Caol and Mallaig would have been renamed Caol, Mallaig and the Small Isles to recognise the island communities within the ward. Boundaries Scotland said the changes would "create more recognisable ward boundaries by Inverness, Tain and Knoydart" and "better align with the historical Caithness–Sutherland county boundary". However, the proposals in Highland were rejected by the Scottish Parliament and the 21 wards created under the Local Governance (Scotland) Act 2004 remained in place.

Uncontested seats
After nominations closed on 30 March 2022, there were not enough candidates in Caol and Mallaig to require an election: three candidates stood for the three seats available. As a result, Green candidate Andrew Baldrey, Liberal Democrats candidate John Colin Grafton and Conservative candidate Liz Saggers were elected without a poll. This was one of a number of uncontested wards across Scotland, with a total of 18 councillors automatically elected. Despite their candidate being elected without a poll, the lack of interest in standing for election was called a "threat to local democracy" by the Greens. During the 2017 local elections in Scotland, just three council wards were uncontested, but votes were held in every ward in both 2007 and 2012 – the first elections to use multi-member wards and the Single transferable vote. Public disinterest in standing for election to local councils has been linked to the "ridiculous" size of some local authorities and the low pay councillors receive for their work.

Results

Note: "Votes" are the first preference votes. The net gain/loss and percentage changes relate to the result of the previous Scottish local elections on 4 May 2017. This may differ from other published sources showing gain/loss relative to seats held at dissolution of Scotland's councils.

Ward summary

|- class="unsortable" align="centre"
!rowspan=2 align="left"|Ward
! % 
!Cllrs
! %
!Cllrs
! %
!Cllrs
! %
!Cllrs
! %
!Cllrs
! %
!Cllrs
! %
!Cllrs
!rowspan=2|TotalCllrs
|- class="unsortable" align="center"
!colspan=2 bgcolor=""|SNP
!colspan=2 bgcolor=""|Ind
!colspan=2 bgcolor=""|Lib Dem
!colspan=2 bgcolor=""|Conservative
!colspan=2 bgcolor=""|Green
!colspan=2 bgcolor=""|Lab
!colspan=2 bgcolor="white"|Others
|-
|align="left"|North, West and Central Sutherland
|bgcolor="" |35.1
|bgcolor="" |1
|17.3
|1
|28.1
|1
|11.0
|0
|colspan="2" rowspan="5" 
|3.9
|0
|4.6
|0
|3
|-
|align="left"|Thurso and North West Caithness
|18.4
|1
|bgcolor="" |36.2
|bgcolor="" |1
|27.5
|1
|17.9
|1
|colspan="2" 
|colspan="2" rowspan="2" 
|4
|-
|align="left"|Wick and East Caithness
|25.3
|1
|23.3
|1
|bgcolor="" |29.8
|bgcolor="" |1
|15.1
|1
|6.5
|0
|4
|-
|align="left"|East Sutherland and Edderton
|26.5
|1
|19.0
|1
|bgcolor="" |35.8
|bgcolor="" |1
|17.0
|0
|colspan="2" rowspan="2" 
|1.6
|0
|3
|-
|align="left"|Wester Ross, Strathpeffer and Lochalsh
|bgcolor="" |41.1
|bgcolor="" |2
|28.7
|1
|12.9
|0
|17.3
|1
|colspan="2" rowspan="5" 
|4
|-
|align="left"|Cromarty Firth
|29.1
|1
|bgcolor="" |29.2
|bgcolor="" |2
|27.9
|1
|6.7
|0
|2.9
|0
|4.2
|0
|4
|-
|align="left"|Tain and Easter Ross
|30.6
|1
|bgcolor="" |37.3
|bgcolor="" |1
|21.5
|1
|10.6
|0
|colspan="2" 
|colspan="2" 
|3
|-
|align="left"|Dingwall and Seaforth
|bgcolor="" |32.2
|bgcolor="" |1
|28.0
|2
|16.7
|1
|14.0
|0
|4.5
|0
|4.7
|0
|4
|-
|align="left"|Black Isle
|24.9
|1
|bgcolor="" |26.3
|bgcolor="" |1
|15.7
|1
|14.8
|0
|13.3
|0
|5.2
|0
|3
|-
|align="left"|Eilean a' Cheò
|22.6
|1
|bgcolor="" |56.1
|bgcolor="" |2
|3.5
|0
|10.7
|1
|colspan="2" 
|3.5
|0
|3.7
|0
|4
|-
|align="left"|Caol and Mallaig
|colspan=5 align="center" 
|1
| 
|1
| 
|1
|colspan=4 
|3
|-
|align="left"|Aird and Loch Ness
|26.2
|1
|bgcolor="" |31.0
|bgcolor="" |1
|6.6
|0
|21.1
|1
|10.2
|1
|4.9
|0
|colspan="2" 
|4
|-
|align="left"|Inverness West
|31.2
|1
|8.1
|0
|bgcolor="" |34.2
|bgcolor="" |1
|9.3
|0
|7.5
|1
|8.4
|0
|1.3
|0
|3
|-
|align="left"|Inverness Central
|bgcolor="" |41.3
|bgcolor="" |2
|5.1
|0
|6.4
|0
|12.8
|0
|7.5
|0
|24.1
|1
|2.8
|0
|3
|-
|align="left"|Inverness Ness-side
|29.2
|1
|5.6
|0
|bgcolor="" |44.5
|bgcolor="" |1
|8.7
|0
|5.2
|0
|6.4
|1
|0.4
|0
|3
|-
|align="left"|Inverness Millburn
|bgcolor="" |40.8
|bgcolor="" |1
|colspan="2" 
|23.8
|1
|21.6
|1
|colspan="2" rowspan="3" 
|13.9
|0
|colspan="2" 
|3
|-
|align="left"|Culloden and Ardersier
|bgcolor="" |37.6
|bgcolor="" |1
|15.9
|1
|15.3
|1
|17.9
|0
|10.1
|0
|3.3
|0
|3
|-
|align="left"|Nairn and Cawdor
|27.2
|1
|bgcolor="" |43.9
|bgcolor="" |2
|10.5
|0
|16.2
|1
|colspan="2" 
|2.2
|0
|4
|-
|align="left"|Inverness South
|bgcolor="" |35.2
|bgcolor="" |1
|24.8
|1
|8.6
|1
|16.9
|1
|5.4
|0
|7.3
|0
|1.9
|0
|4
|-
|align="left"|Badenoch and Strathspey
|22.7
|1
|bgcolor="" |38.4
|bgcolor="" |2
|8.8
|0
|15.6
|1
|10.3
|0
|4.2
|0
|colspan="2" rowspan="2" 
|4
|-
|align="left"|Fort William and Ardnamurchan
|33.5
|1
|9.3
|1
|bgcolor="" |37.5
|bgcolor="" |1
|10.1
|0
|9.6
|1
|colspan="2" 
|4
|- class="unsortable" class="sortbottom"
!align="left"|Total
!30.1
!22
!25.6
!21
!19.7
!15
!14.6
!10
!4.0
!4
!5.0
!2
!1.0
!0
!74
|}

Ward results

North, West and Central Sutherland
2017: 1 SNP; 1 Lib Dem; 1 Independent
Pre-election: 1 SNP; 1 Lib Dem; 1 Independent
2022: 1 SNP; 1 Lib Dem; 1 Independent

Thurso and North West Caithness
2017: 2 Independent; 1 SNP; 1 Conservative
Pre-election: 2 Independent; 1 SNP; 1 Conservative
2022: 1 SNP; 1 Lib Dem; 1 Conservative; 1 Independent

Wick and East Caithness
2017: 2 Independent; 1 SNP; 1 Conservative
Pre-election: 1 SNP; 1 Lib Dem; 1 Conservative; 1 Independent
2022: 1 SNP; 1 Lib Dem; 1 Conservative; 1 Independent

East Sutherland and Edderton
2017: 1 Lib Dem; 1 Labour; 1 Independent
Pre-election: 1 Lib Dem; 1 Labour; 1 Independent
2022: 1 SNP; 1 Lib Dem; 1 Independent

Wester Ross, Strathpeffer and Lochalsh
2017: 1 SNP; 1 Lib Dem; 1 Conservative; 1 Independent
Pre-election: 2 SNP; 1 Conservative; 1 Independent
2022: 2 SNP; 1 Conservative; 1 Independent

Cromarty Firth
2017: 2 SNP; 2 Independent
Pre-election: 4 Independent
2022: 2 Independent; 1 SNP; 1 Lib Dem

Tain and Easter Ross
2017: 1 SNP; 1 Lib Dem; 1 Independent
Pre-election: 2 Independent; 1 SNP
2022: 1 SNP; 1 Lib Dem; 1 Independent

Dingwall and Seaforth
2017: 2 Independent; 1 SNP; 1 Lib Dem
Pre-election: 2 Independent; 1 SNP; 1 Lib Dem
2022: 2 Independent; 1 SNP; 1 Lib Dem

Black Isle
2017: 1 SNP; 1 Lib Dem; 1 Independent
Pre-election: 1 SNP; 1 Lib Dem; 1 Independent
2022: 1 SNP; 1 Lib Dem; 1 Independent

Eilean a' Cheò
2017: 3 Independent; 1 SNP
Pre-election: 4 Independent
2022: 2 Independent: 1 SNP; 1 Conservative

Caol and Mallaig
2017: 2 Independent; 1 SNP
Pre-election: 1 Lib Dem; 1 Independent; 1 Vacant
2022: 1 Lib Dem; 1 Conservative; 1 Green

Aird and Loch Ness
2017: 2 Independent; 1 SNP; 1 Conservative
Pre-election: 3 Independent; 1 SNP
2022: 1 SNP; 1 Conservative; 1 Green; 1 Independent

Inverness West
2017: 1 SNP; 1 Lib Dem; 1 Independent
Pre-election: 2 Lib Dem; 1 SNP
2022: 1 SNP; 1 Lib Dem; 1 Green

Inverness Central
2017: 1 SNP; 1 Labour; 1 Independent
Pre-election: 1 SNP; 1 Labour; 1 Independent
2022: 2 SNP; 1 Labour

Inverness Ness-side
2017: 1 SNP; 1 Lib Dem; 1 Conservative
Pre-election: 1 Lib Dem; 1 Conservative; 1 Independent
2022: 1 SNP; 1 Lib Dem; 1 Labour

Inverness Millburn
2017: 1 SNP; 1 Labour; 1 Conservative
Pre-election: 1 SNP; 1 Labour; 1 Conservative
2022: 1 SNP; 1 Lib Dem; 1 Conservative

Culloden and Ardersier
2017: 1 SNP; 1 Lib Dem; 1 Independent
Pre-election: 1 SNP; 1 Lib Dem; 1 Independent
2022: 1 SNP; 1 Lib Dem; 1 Independent

Nairn and Cawdor
2017: 2 Independent; 1 SNP; 1 Conservative
Pre-election: 3 Independent; 1 Conservative
2022: 2 Independent; 1 SNP; 1 Conservative

Inverness South
2017: 1 SNP; 1 Lib Dem; 1 Conservative; 1 Independent
Pre-election: 1 SNP; 1 Lib Dem; 1 Conservative; 1 Independent
2022: 1 SNP; 1 Lib Dem; 1 Conservative; 1 Independent

Badenoch and Strathspey
2017: 1 SNP; 1 Conservative; 1 Green; 1 Independent
Pre-election: 1 SNP; 1 Conservative; 1 Green; 1 Independent
2022: 2 Independent; 1 SNP; 1 Conservative

Fort William and Ardnamurchan
2017: 2 SNP; 1 Conservative; 1 Independent
Pre-election: 3 SNP; 1 Conservative
2022: 1 SNP; 1 Lib Dem; 1 Green; 1 Independent

Notes

Footnotes

References

Highland Council elections
Highland